Art Official Intelligence: Mosaic Thump is the fifth studio album by American hip hop group De La Soul, it was released on August 8, 2000.

Overview 
The album was the first in a planned three-disc installment, which was originally intended to be a three-disc album. Among the guests on the album are, Redman, Tash and J-Ro of Tha Liks, Xzibit, Busta Rhymes, Mike D and Ad Rock of the Beastie Boys, Busy Bee, Freddie Foxxx and soul diva Chaka Khan.

Unlike their previous album, Stakes Is High, Mosaic Thump returned De La Soul to chart territory again thanks to the hit singles "Oooh.", and "All Good?".  The album was also nominated for a Grammy.

The Japanese version of the album featured album art by celebrity hip hop-inspired manga artist Santa Inoue, owner of Santastic! Entertainment clothing line.

Critical reception 

Art Official Intelligence: Mosaic Thump generally received overall positive reviews from critics. James Poletti of Yahoo! Music gave the album an eight out of ten star review. "In keeping with the current vogue for hip hop albums with more guests than Letterman, over 50 per cent of this album features appearances from everyone from Redman to Chaka Khan", which he said may or may not have something to do with finding a unique voice in hip hop. "The really refreshing change with De La Soul is not simply their lack of bullshit but their proud rejection of hip-hop's nihilism." Michael Goldberg of Neumu gave the album the same eight out of ten star review and simply said that the number of guest stars in the album, "keeps things lively". "The grooves are righteous and the vibe is right" Goldberg stated.

Commercial performance
In their home country of the United States, Art Official Intelligence: Mosaic Thump debuted at number 9 on the Billboard 200, selling 81,000 copies in its first week.

Track listing

Charts and certifications

Weekly charts

Certifications

References

External links 
 Art Official Intelligence: Mosaic Thump at VH1
 

De La Soul albums
2000 albums
Tommy Boy Records albums
Albums produced by Rockwilder
Albums produced by J Dilla
Albums recorded at Electric Lady Studios